Maria Oleksandrivna Halych (19 August 1901–22 January 1974) was a Ukrainian writer, the author of impressionistic prose. Since 1920 a member of the Kyiv literary group ASPYS, Lanka - Mars.

Early life and education 
Maria Halych was born into a teacher's family with many children in Sukha Kalihirka village, now Katerynopil district, Cherkasy region. After graduating from a two-class school, in 1918, she moved to Kyiv, where she worked at various jobs and studied at preparatory courses. In 1921, Halych entered the philological faculty of Kyiv National University of Theater, Cinema, and Television, which she graduated in 1926 without defending her diploma.

Career 

Halych took part in the women's movement. She also participated in the efforts to eliminate illiteracy. From 1926 to 1930, she taught the Ukrainian language and literature in a workers' school. From 1928 to 29, Halych worked as a technical secretary of the Kyiv Local Committee of Writers and in 1930 as a film fiction writer at the Kyiv Film Factory. In 1931, Halych married and moved to Kharkiv, where she taught Ukrainian at the Agricultural Institute. In the 1930s, she withdrew from literary work, although she tried to return to it later.  

After World War II, Halych lived in Lviv, where she taught Ukrainian language and literature at foreign language courses at the Teacher Improvement Institute and preparatory courses, and circles of scientific workers at the Lviv Forestry and Zooveterinary Institute. Together with her husband, S. Postrygan, she compiled the Terminological Dictionary of a Forester (Lviv, 1980).After the rehabilitation of the members of “Lanka,” Halych takes an active part in the Lviv evenings of commemoration and writes memories about Yevhen Pluzhnyk, Hryhorii Kosynka, and Valerian Podmohylny, which remained in manuscripts. 

Maria Halych died in Lviv and was buried on field 68 of the Lychakiv cemetery in Lviv.

Works 
Halych wrote Impressionist prose such as the collections Printer (1927), My Career (1930), short story Spring (1928), and memoirs. The works of Maria Halych describe the fate of women under new social conditions as well as human psychology in a critical, "borderline" situation.

The post-war works by Halych are marked by communist ideology: Kharitina (1956), Mothers and Children (1957), and Girl with a Gun (1954).

References 

1901 births
1974 deaths
20th-century Ukrainian women writers
Executed Renaissance
Burials at Lychakiv Cemetery